is a fictional character in the Tekken fighting game series, first appearing in Tekken in 1994. Anna is the histrionic and flamboyant younger sister of the quiet and serious Nina Williams, the personal bodyguard of Kazuya Mishima and second-in-command at G Corporation. She is also, although unbeknownst to her, the maternal aunt of boxing competitor Steve Fox. She is defined by her rivalry with her older sister Nina, a trait that has been around since the original Tekken game.

Anna originally shared most of her moves with her older sister Nina, but has since gained a more idiosyncratic moveset. In the other Tekken media, including films, Anna usually appears in role of a minor villainess. The character was met with positive critical reception.

Appearances

In video games
Anna Williams was the youngest daughter of an Irish father, Richard and British mother, Heather. Anna and was raised in Ireland together with her elder sister Nina. She and Nina were taught various martial arts by their father, a former assassin Richard Williams since young age. Anna was also personally trained by her mother. When Richard died under mysterious circumstances the sisters blamed each other, leading to a long-standing rivalry between them. After this, both sisters went their separate ways with Nina using her skills to become an assassin, and Anna joining the paramilitary and becoming an officer in the Tekken Force.

Anna plays only a very minor role in the story of the first game, appearing as a sub-boss character for Nina. Her story was further expanded in later games. In Tekken 2, as in the first tournament, the 20-year-old Nina was once again hired to assassinate the sponsor of the current tournament, Kazuya Mishima. Whether at Kazuya's discretion or Anna's own volition, Anna became a bodyguard for Kazuya, along with Ganryu and Bruce Irvin, who were all charged with Kazuya's protection. Nina was later captured by Mishima Zaibatsu forces and used in Dr. Bosconovitch's cryonics research. Anna was also captured by Kazuya to be another test subject, in the "cold sleep" project by Bosconovitch. Both sisters were put in cryogenic sleep, the experiment went on for 15 years. 

In Tekken 3, after being placed in suspended animation during the second tournament, Nina was awoken 15 years later by the influence of the recently excavated Ogre, who compelled her to assassinate Jin Kazama. Anna was awoken at the same time as her sister, though she was unaffected by Ogre's influence. Nina also began to suffer ill effects from the 'cold-sleep', resulting in long-term memory loss. In an act of compassion, Anna set out to stop Nina from once again becoming an assassin, and to help her recover her memory loss. However, she failed at the end of the tournament when Nina recovered her memory about her rivalry with Anna, which resulted in Nina leaving and cutting all contact with Anna.

In Tekken 4, it was confirmed that Anna makes a cameo appearance in Nina's prologue. She was mentioned by the game's unused files. Anna is absent in Tekken 4, though she is briefly mentioned in Nina's Tekken 4 prologue.

In Tekken 5, Nina decides to make contact with Anna in hopes of restoring her memory, but their meeting triggers Nina's lost feelings of hostility towards her sister, and she immediately opens fire. Anna retaliates, and the reunion descends into a gunfight which lasts for days. The sisters eventually reach a stalemate and agree to settle things for good and a portion of their battle can be seen in the introductory sequence of the game. During their battle in the tournament, both sisters agreed that only one would walk away from their battle alive. However, when Nina defeats Anna, she refuses to take Anna's life as she felt the fight was not satisfactory.

Humiliated by her loss, Anna seeks revenge at Nina, who has already gone into hiding. Anna hears rumors she has become Jin's new bodyguard, thus being involved with the Mishima Zaibatsu. In another attempt to have a chance to battle Nina, she offers herself as a personal bodyguard to the CEO of G Corporation, Kazuya Mishima, knowing that his plan to confront Jin would eventually lead her to her sister. She enters The King of Iron Fist Tournament 6 at Kazuya's request. In Scenario Campaign, Anna leads the defense of G Corporation against Mishima Zaibatsu and Lars Alexandersson's rebel army, and during a confrontation with the rebel army, she sends troops that results in Lars' friend, Tougou's death. She also accompanies Kazuya when he comes to Azazel's Temple in the desert. Upon the latter's stalemate battle with Lars, Anna escapes with Kazuya after he is let go by Lars.

Anna appears in Nina's own spin-off action game Death by Degrees as a commander of the Tekken Force. Like in the Tekken games, Anna fights using her fists and her feet, appearing in several encounters. After Nina wins the game's final boss fight against her, Anna almost falls into the water below but Nina grabs her hand, and then she reminisces about when her father Richard Williams was killed with gunfire and Anna comforted her afterwards. Another explosion almost sends them both into the water, but Anna jumps rescues Nina in turn. Once the game is completed, Anna becomes a player character in her own scenario, titled "Anna Mode", which is more difficult than the standard game as there are limited recovery items and weapons and no save locations in the first play through, and Anna can use melee weapons but no guns. The Anna Mode takes place in the Prison used in the standard game, but with many more enemies, as she must find 12 data cards and then reach the helicopter evacuation spot. Anna also appears as the final boss in Challenge Mode.

She also appears in the non-canon games Tekken Card Challenge, Tekken Tag Tournament, Tekken Tag Tournament 2 and Tekken 3D: Prime Edition.

Anna is playable in Tekken 7 as part of the Season 2 DLC. After the events of Tekken 6, Anna's heart grew tired of endless fighting. Following her retirement, she met and fell in love with an elite soldier from the G Corporation. But, on the day of their wedding, tragedy occurred. Whilst getting ready for the big day, the sound of gun shots filled the main hall. Anna rushed to the noise, arriving to find her fiancé dead and Nina fleeing the scene with Anna’s stolen wedding dress. Anna, fueled by rage, decided to return to the fight once more. Unbeknownst to Anna, her nephew Steve Fox is also after Nina.

Design and gameplay
Anna is sultry and curvy with a brown or black chelsea hair, wearing stylish red and blue outfits. Before the fight, she is seen flirting and teasing the enemy, and then to ridicule meeting ends with a coarse laugh and provocative moves; for her attitude and way of clothing can be considered as a flapper as well as a femme fatale character. Usually, she is shown wearing a modified silk qipao/cheongsam with floral pantyhose along with matching gloves and shoes, often high heels, and she keeps her hair well-coiffed and cut to the neckline. She is also seen a few times wearing a zebra printed jumpsuit with a matching zebra printed hat, a necklace, black gloves, and black heels. She is often among the few characters who are given a third outfit option, as opposed to the standard two, some of them designed by Mamoru Nagano. In Death by Degrees, Anna is wearing a more Nina-style high-tech combat outfit and has a different haircut. Her look was revamped once more for Tekken Tag Tournament 2. She is 18 in the first Tekken, 20 in Tekken 2, and 41 in Tekken 6; although she is in her 40s, cryosleep effects preserved her physical abilities of her 20s.

Anna is featured as Nina's sub-boss in the original Tekken game and did not become a playable character until the console version of the game. She is Nina's sub-boss in the other Tekken games as well, except for Tekken 4, the only game in the Tekken series in which she does not appear. In Tekken 5 her sub-boss is Lee Chaolan, and she is also a sub-boss for Craig Marduk. She is also the final boss of Death by Degrees. In most games she is in, she usually only appears as an unlockable/time-release character, though Tekken Tag Tournament notably makes her a default character, and Tekken 6 and Tekken Tag Tournament 2 do away with the time release system entirely, making everyone playable on launch. Anna was added to the Tekken 7 roster in 2018 as part of the Season 2 DLC character pack.

Anna's fighting style is based on hapkido, a martial art that is known for its efficient spinning back kicks, jumping kicks and throws at closer fighting distances. Despite this, she and Nina have both a unique fighting martial art.

Other appearances

Anna appears in the anime Tekken: The Motion Picture as one of primary villains. Her rivalry with Nina is also one of the film's subplots, with a few differences, such as the two vying for the attention of Lee Chaolan, their unfaithful contractor who has hired them both to kill Kazuya, who Heihachi intends to bequeath the Mishima Zaibatsu to. She is the only sister who manages to have sex with Lee, implying that he felt more loyalty to her than Nina. During her confrontation with Nina, it is revealed that Anna murdered their father in cold blood out of resentment for him giving more attention to Nina when they were children. Anna is ultimately ambushed from behind and devoured by a biologically enhanced dinosaur-like being (based loosely on Alex) while Nina escapes after Lee kills himself and Kazuya defeats Heihachi.

In the live-action film Tekken, portrayed by Marian Zapico as a Yakuza assassin working alongside Nina. They are also Kazuya's lovers. Kazuya sends them to assassinate Jin Kazama, but the ensuing fight attracts Christie Monteiro's attention and Nina and Anna flee. Unlike the games, she and Nina are in good terms and has no relation to Steve Fox. Anna also appears in the CGI-animated film Tekken: Blood Vengeance, in which she works under Kazuya Mishima and forces Ling Xiaoyu to find Shin Kamiya.

Her manga and comic book appearances include Tekken: Tatakai no Kanatani, Tekken Saga, Tekken Forever, Tekken 2 and Tekken: Blood Feud. In 2000, Epoch Co. released a 1/6 scale Anna Williams action figure, based her appearance from Tekken 3. A small PVC figure was also released by Yujin in the SR Namco Girls Part 5 series in 2004 and another was designed by Shunya Yamashita in 2015. A live-action Anna, portrayed by Elle Navarro, also appears in the Tekken Tag Tournament 2 trailer "Girl Power", shown at Comic-Con in 2012.

Reception
The character has often been noted for her sex appeal. In 2008, GameDaily listed Anna as one of its top 50 "hottest game babes" noting her "debonair" fighting style and attractiveness. In 2009, PlayStation Universe ranked the uncensored version of Anna's Tekken 3 ending as the ninth greatest Tekken ending of all time. In 2011, UGO.com featured her in their own list of the 50 "hottest" female characters in video games. Play included her in the lists of top ten "bitches in games" and ten of best chat-up lines. In 2012, Complex ranked her as the seventh "hottest" video game character. In 2013, 4thletter placed Anna's Tekken 5 ending cutscene at 136th place in their list of the top fighting game endings. She was included among sexiest girls in games by IGN Spain in 2012 and was ranked as the 22nd best-looking game girl by GameHall's Portal PlayGame in 2014.

Some noted Anna's similarity to her sister Nina; Interia.pl included both of them among the sexiest game female villains of 2012. In 2011, Joystiq stated they "can't help but be saddened by the news" that Capcom producer Yoshinori Ono wanted Anna to be included in the character roster of Street Fighter X Tekken, but "the director was against putting Anna because we already had Nina in." GamesRadar commented on that: "We can only hope that the Irish femme fatale finds her way into Tekken X Street Fighter." In the official poll by Namco Bandai Games, Anna placed as the 16th most requested Tekken character to be added to the roster of Tekken X Street Fighter. Anna was also voted the third most missing character in Tekken 7.

See also 
 List of Tekken characters

References

External links

Action film characters
Action film villains]
Ansatsuken
Cryonically preserved characters in video games
Female characters in anime and manga
Female characters in video games
Female video game villains
Fictional martial artists in video games
Fictional aikidoka
Fictional assassins in video games
Fictional bodyguards in video games
Fictional British people in video games
Fictional female martial artists
Fictional hapkido practitioners
Fictional Irish people in video games
Fictional Taido practitioners
Namco protagonists
Namco antagonists
Tekken characters
Woman soldier and warrior characters in video games
Video game bosses
Video game characters introduced in 1994